Hoodiana is a genus of thrips in the family Phlaeothripidae.

Species
 Hoodiana pallida

References

Phlaeothripidae
Thrips
Thrips genera
Monotypic insect genera